On May 14, 2011, the city of San Antonio, Texas held an election to choose who would serve as Mayor of San Antonio for a two-year term to expire in 2013. Julian Castro, the incumbent Mayor, was re-elected with over 81% of the vote, earning a second term.

Background
Julian Castro, who was first elected mayor in the 2009 mayoral election, opted to seek re-election as mayor. The three main challengers that challenged him in 2009 (Trish DeBerry-Mejia, Diane Cibrian and Sheila McNeil), opted not to seek a re-match, and at the closing of the filing period, faced only four challengers.

Declared
 Julian Castro, incumbent Mayor of San Antonio.
 Michael "Commander" Idrogo 
 Will McLeod 
 James Rodriguez 
 Rhett R. Smith

Results 
On May 14, 2011, the election for Mayor was held. Julian Castro secured re-election with over 81% of the vote, thus negating the need of a runoff election (which would have been required if no candidate got 50%+1 of all votes cast).

 
 
 
 
 
 
 
* Vote percentage include all of Bexar County with a total of 10,538 either voting in another municipal election, casting a spoiled vote or casting no ballot for San Antonio mayor.

References

 

21st century in San Antonio
2011 Texas elections
2011 United States mayoral elections
Julian Castro
2011
Non-partisan elections